Philanthrojournalism (also known as not-for-profit journalism (NPJ), non-profit journalism or think tank journalism) is the practice of journalism as a non-profit organization. Like all non-profit organizations, NPJs depend on private donations or foundation grants to pay for operational expenses.  This branch of journalism is not to be confused with other types of nonprofit news media organizations in the non-investigative field.  Although they have existed for decades, the proliferation of the World Wide Web and internet have helped create a booming industry of non-profit investigative centers. Their existence has sparked widespread debate over their ability to remain neutral, especially when their revenue depends on ideologically skewed funding organizations or donors. In times of a large decline in newspaper revenue and crises in the newspaper industries, other scholars have also argued whether this is, in fact, a sustainable initiative. Still others have claimed their support for philanthrojournalism, and its ability to maintain high quality, and be less constrained by advertisers.

Though there is limited research on philanthrojournalistic organizations, a few studies shed some light on their advantages and limitations. Organizations with a national-level scope are more identifiable, as they compare to mainstream commercial news organizations. According to journalism.org, these organizations fall into two main categories: group sites, part of formal families organized by a single funder and associated sites, those that share content but operate independently.

Historical background 

Although non-profit journalism dates back to the start of the Associated Press in 1846, the first group dedicated to investigative journalism was the Center for Investigative Reporting (CIR), which formed in 1977. Moreover, journalist Charles Lewis founded the Center for Public Integrity in 1989. Since then, many other non-profits have proliferated firstly in the United States, and then, elsewhere in the world. Due to their alternative funding models, many of these organizations have contributed deeply to investigative journalism. For example, ProPublica, a non-profit investigative center, won two Pulitzer prizes over the course of its work.

The number of nonprofit investigative reporting centers has escalated from only three in the late 1980s to over 40 today, with centers originating in countries such as Romania, the Philippines, Jordan, and South Africa. Four global conferences on investigative journalism since 2000 have attracted some 2,000 journalists from more than 50 countries. There have been many initiatives to increase transparency and accountability in funding. For example, the Institute for Nonprofit News (INN), formed in 2009, is a network of investigative non-for-profit centers in which membership requires being a registered charity with transparent funding.

The proliferation of investigative centers ranges from state-oriented initiatives to local grassroots-based initiatives.  The state or region-based model tends to be more sustainable, as it is usually funded by foundations in the same area. State-oriented centers such as  the Wisconsin Center for Investigative Journalism and New England Center for Investigative Reporting are garnering increasing success. They are also, arguably, viable alternatives to the nationwide news outlets. Likewise, there are an increasing number of local-level investigative centers, in places such as Baltimore and Texas, making their narrow-focus even more relatable to local readers.

Theoretical background

Critique of philanthrojournalism

David Westphal (2009) in his Philanthropic Foundations: growing funders of the news has expressed support for philanthrojournalism, but not without skepticism. He notes that many of the news organizations report based on their funder’s interest areas. For example, in Westphal’s analysis of the Kaiser Family Foundation’s support for health-news initiatives, funders were concerned with having less control over the health information they were funding, as it was channeled through other mediators.  Meanwhile, Robert McChesney and John Nichols (2010) are more concerned with the sustainability of such initiatives and whether the foundation-funding model will be able to survive with "less than one tenth the annual newsroom budget of…the New York Times". Moreover, Robert Arnove and Nadine Pinede (2007) undertook a study on the "big three" US-based foundations – Ford, Rockefeller and Carnegie – and revealed that they play the role of unofficial planning agencies, have a very US-centric model, and utilize a very "elitist, technocratic approach to social change." Likewise, Sean Stannard-Stockton, claims that in addition to maintaining the status quo, many foundations use “hard power” to “shape events by providing or withdrawing grants” thereby creating a dependence by non-profit organizations.  Therefore, as a whole, most critics of non-profit journalism concur that their dependence on donors leads them to maintaining elites powers of control. Bob Feldman (2007) adds that the processes used to gain such finding are modeled in  “safe, legalistic, bureaucratic activities and mild reformism” and creates a “climate of secrecy” as the foundations domesticate their agendas.

Support for philanthrojournalism

Harry Browne, (2010) acknowledges some of the advantages of philanthrojournalism. For example, he notes, that the removal of direct commercial pressures could allow reporters "more time to work on a story, by freeing them to pursue less-popular topics and by reducing the likelihood of pressure from an owner or advertiser."  Browne also notes that if philanthrojournalism seeks to remain transparent by constantly informing the public about its ultimate source of subsidy and the work of its donors, and if it also seeks to do so in a democratic manner, philanthrojournalism could become more accountable. Moreover, Journalism.org has noted that the dependence of these centers on donors leads to focusing great attention to quality. Consequently, many organizations such as ProPublica and the Texas Tribune are able to have multiple donors and raise millions of dollars due to the many journalism awards they have received.

Rebecca Nee (2011), meanwhile, argues that philanthrojournalism could become an alternative to mainstream media. Nee emphasizes the decreasing role of mainstream news media, as she cites the 2010 State of the News Media report, which claimed that circulation had dropped by one quarter since the 21st century.  Nee also adds that the digital revolution has fuelled an increasing number of readers to opt for online newspaper. Therefore, by being digital-grown, many non-profit investigative centers not only need decreased sources of revenue, but also manage to thrive in their area of digital expertise. NPJ centers are slightly in the lead over mainstream media in terms of digital innovation, as they can focus on their resources on doing so. Moreover, Nee argues that the narrow investigative scope of NPJ centers allows them to not waste their resources on a daily journalism agenda.

Funding 

Funding has been one of the most controversial issues of philanthrojournalism. While dependence on advertising revenue is eliminated, it is replaced with dependence on foundations. As mainstream media is struggling in terms of revenue, NPJ centers are exploring new business models. A recent study at American University, revealed that foundations had contributed to  approximately $128 million to community and investigative reporting nonprofits between 2005 and 2009.

Between May 2010 and September 2011, the Pew Research Center’s Journalism Project implemented a wide-scale study on 46 national-level non-profit investigative organizations created after 2005, and examined their transparency, political bias, number of revenue streams and productivity.  The study showed that, within that time period, the news organizations, which have multiple funding sources and are transparent about funding  have a more balanced ideological perspective.  For example, out of the organizations studied, 56% were ideologically skewed. Likewise, the most ideologically skewed organizations tended to be funded mostly or entirely by one parent organization. More often than not the topics covered on these sites correlated with the political orientation of their donors. For example, while the liberal-oriented American Independent News sites favored discussions of organized labor and the environment, the more conservative Watchdog.org, meanwhile, focused on government policies and their inefficiency and waste. Examples of sites with the most balanced coverage are ProPublica and the Texas Tribune, which are also among the most trafficked in the sample.

Therefore, as suggested in the study, while bias and transparency are possible hindrances to the ethicality of NPJ centers, it is greatly reduced when revenue is dependent on multiple donors with diverse ideological orientations.  However, these donor-funded centers could also be unsustainable in the long-term. For example, the CCIR relies heavily on individual donations, which average $100 to $200 and make up 30 to 50 percent of its revenue. Nevertheless, the prospects of unsustainability are also greatly reduced with the increase of multiple donors. Many centers, such as the Voice of San Diego, are also utilizing hybrid models of philanthropy and private sector revenue combinations.  The Bay Citizen, for example, bases its funds on four sources of revenue.

Moreover, the executive director of CCIR,  Bilbo Poynter, has argued that a large number of donors could also increase competition and therefore the need for credibility and transparency for both donors and the investigative centers.  Many organizations, such as ProPublica, are publishing the salary of their journalists as well as the center sources of revenue on their websites. Thus, an increase in the number of donors, also tends to increase political neutrality, sustainability, transparency and productivity.

Cooperation with mainstream media 

Many organizations cooperate with mainstream media and even subsidize investigations to use their broad networks for their news stories. Almost all nonprofit media outlets have collaborated with either print and broadcast commercial outlets or public media outlets in their region. In some cases, the centers had formal arrangements with revenue exchanged, whilst in other cases, collaboration was on a story-by-story basis and did not include revenue, but only a sharing of resources and expenses.  For example, ProPublica won a 2010 Pulitzer Prize in collaboration with the New York Times for an investigative report on one hospital’s emergency response to treating flood victims of Hurricane Katrina. Many mainstream media outlets also find themselves in need for such collaborations due to their financial struggles.

Advantages of philanthrojournalism 

At a time when the media industry is struggling,  philanthrojournalism is providing an alternative business model. Their ability to start anew by being digital-grown helps them be innovative, with the latest digital tools, being free of printing press, and most importantly, to not be dependent on print advertising.  NPJ centers also have the ability, unlike commercial news media, to disconnect from the consumerist needs of the market place.

Moreover, the narrow focus of the centers on investigative journalism helps them focus on improving quality of such comprehensive reporting. This narrow focus also reflects the original idea of the news industry to act as civic journalism. ProPublica’s Richard Tofel  argues that investigative reporting will never become obsolete, as it increasingly competes with declining mainstream media that focuses on daily politics.

The dependency on donors can also force NPJ centers to depend on credibility for funding, and therefore improve their standards. For example, three major NPJs, the Center for Public Integrity, ProPublica and the Center for Investigative Reporting are succeeding greatly, winning Pulitzer Prizes, and in return receiving more donor-based funding. According to a study, many reporters felt the nonprofit funding model gives them greater freedom to choose stories based on merit and public impact rather than popularity. Unlike mainstream media, which relies more on business strategies, NPJ centers do not need to show their philanthropic funders an immediate return on investment.  They are, therefore, less subjected to agenda-setting commercial pressures than mainstream media. Their non-profit nature also allows them to be exempted from taxes from the federal government.

Additionally, many initiatives to increase transparency are proliferating. For example, ProPublica, as well as many other non-profit centers are publishing details of their funding revenues, the salaries of their reporters and the ideological perspectives of their donors.   More concrete networks such as the Investigative News Network has forced members to be a registered charity and be transparent in their funding.

While critics criticise philanthrojournalism for being unsustainable, they fail to acknowledge the hybrid models many NPJs have adapted to. Many nonprofit centers receive their revenue through a total or partial combination of the following strategies: membership donations, corporate sponsorships or advertising, charging other media for content, providing services such as analyzing and posting date, training students and journalists and creating an endowment. Moreover, unlike mainstream media, which more often than not, continues to utilize print versions, most NPJs are digital-born. They can, therefore, focus all their resources on hiring technicians or reporters with greater expertise in digital media. Many are utilizing social media, which, consequently, is increasingly bringing them closer to younger generations.

Disadvantages of philanthrojournalism 

Non-profit investigative centers are criticised for being unsustainable. Without funding from philanthropists and foundations, it is difficult for investigative reporting to survive, even with diverse sources of revenue. This is because it is expensive and time-consuming, with no guarantee of success. This, therefore, also relates to the prospects of  NPJ  as being unsustainable. The non-profit composition of such centers also limits the type of revenue sources they can attain. They are also unable to, in theory, be partisan in nature.

Likewise, a study conducted by Rebecca Nee (2010) asserts that many nonprofit centers admit to feeling uncomfortable with their current unsustainable funding and thus plan on diversifying their funding sources.  
Moreover, the dependence on foundations for revenue, can cause an ideological skewing towards the political orientation of their donors. The donors may also have secret propaganda agendas and aim to utilize these news networks for their own spread of knowledge. However, as mentioned earlier, this could be bypassed by increasing the number of donor sources. The centers also have to create a respectable profile to convince foundations, organizations and individuals to donate, which, in return could in increase the quality of  reporting.

Impact on the newspaper industry 

The rise of philanthrojournalism, and the simultaneous decline of mainstream media, suggest it will one day become the dominant model of news media. Another possible outcome is that both forms of media will increasingly cooperate with one another. For example, the Center for Investigative Reporting produces print and broadcast reports under contractual agreements with public and commercial media outlets.    Traditional mainstream media continues to struggle with declining advertising revenue. For example, in 2009, mainstream media faced a revenue decline of up to 25-30 percent.

Commercial media has faced a huge financial collapse and has therefore been forced to lay off many reporters and the reduce the size or completely shut down its foreign bureaus.  Philanthrojournalism, in contrast, is less expansive in its  scope, and relies on a more limited source of revenue. NPJ centers often hire experienced journalists who have left their mainstream media careers. A PEW research study in 2010 reveals that while demand for substantive news is high, the commercial press has not been fulfilling its social responsibility role, especially in terms of investigative journalism  For example, in Los Angeles news outlets, only 1.9% of a 30-minute newscast was devoted to civic affairs, and 3.3% of Los Angeles Times news reporting was devoted to local government news. Moreover, readers are increasingly choosing internet-based news as a source of information over print news. Non-profit centers, unlike mainstream media,  tend to be greater pioneers of civic journalism, as they focus most of their news on civic affairs.
However, skeptics such as new-media consultant Merill Brown, claim that NPJ centers continue to play a minute role in comparison to mainstream media, especially those owned by large conglomerates. As even the multibillion-dollar foundations are also suffering from the financial crisis, the sustainability of these organizations is becoming more farfetched. Nevertheless, while non-profit investigative centers may not, for now, compete with mainstream media, they could play an increasing role in the news field, and possibly increase their partnerships with mainstream media.

References

Types of journalism